Belwe Roman is a display typeface designed by Georg Belwe in 1907. The type has Old Style qualities, but short ascenders and very short descenders as well as calligraphic and Fraktur influences.

Foundry Type

Belwe Roman was originally cast by the Schelter & Giesecke Type Foundry in text, medium bold, and bold weights.  An inline version was cast as well.

Cold Type Copies

Belwe Roman was revived in Cold Type versions by Compugraphic as Belwe.  It was popular enough for all four original weights and styles to be reissued.

Digital Copies

A digital version, also simply called Belwe, was released in 1989 by ITC.  Another version, Belwe EF, is made by Elsner+Flake.

Usage 
Used in the video game Hearthstone, as a UI and card name typeface.
Used in the logo of T-shirt manufacturer Patagonia.

References

Display typefaces
Letterpress typefaces
Typefaces and fonts introduced in 1907